Thomas MacDowell was Bishop of Galloway (1359–1363). He had previously been rector of the parish of “Kyrteum” (perhaps Kirkcolm?), and so was certainly a native of Galloway as his Gaelic name further suggests. He was provided to the see by Pope Innocent VI sometime before December 1359. He was consecrated at Avignon by Cardinal Peter, Bishop of Ostia.

He appeared in the records for the last time in a document dating to September 1362, along with the Bishop of Dunkeld and the Bishop of Brechin as an arbitrator in a dispute between the chapter of Glasgow and its bishop. His successor Adam de Lanark was provided to the see in November 1363, so it is probable that Thomas died sometime in the early part of 1363.

References

 Dowden, John, The Bishops of Scotland, ed. J. Maitland Thomson, (Glasgow, 1912)

1363 deaths
Bishops of Galloway (pre-Reformation)
Medieval Gaels from Ireland
People from Dumfries and Galloway
14th-century Scottish Roman Catholic bishops
Year of birth unknown